Graphic notation (or graphic score) is the representation of music through the use of visual symbols outside the realm of traditional music notation. Graphic notation became popular in the 1950s, and can be used either in combination with or instead of traditional music notation. Graphic notation was influenced by contemporary visual art trends in its conception, bringing stylistic components from modern art into music. Composers often rely on graphic notation in experimental music, where standard musical notation can be ineffective. Other uses include pieces where an aleatoric or undetermined effect is desired. One of the earliest pioneers of this technique was Earle Brown, who, along with John Cage, sought to liberate performers from the constraints of notation and make them active participants in the creation of the music.

Characteristics 

Graphic notation is characterized by its variability and lack of standardization. According to Baker's Student Encyclopedia of Music, Vol. 1, "Graphic notation is used to indicate extremely precise (or intentionally imprecise) pitch or to stimulate musical behavior or actions in performance." Modern graphic notation relies heavily on the imagination and inspiration of each individual performer to interpret the visual content provided by the composer. Because of this relative freedom, the realization of graphically notated pieces usually varies from performance to performance. For example, in notation indication "E" of his piece Concert for Piano and Orchestra, John Cage writes: "Play with hands indicated. Where clefs differ, a note is either bass or treble", an indeterminacy which is not unusual in Cage's work, and which leaves decision-making up to the performer. Some graphic scores can be defined as action-based, where musical gestures are notated as shapes instead of conventional musical ideas.

The use of graphic notation within a score can vary widely, from the score being made up entirely of graphic notation to graphic notation being a small part of an otherwise largely-traditional score. Some composers include written explanations to aid the performer in interpreting the graphic notation, while other composers opt to leave the interpretation entirely up to the performer. Graphic notation is difficult to characterize with specificity, as the notation system is only limited by the imagination and ability of the composer. Though some composers, like John Cage, formulate graphic notation systems which unify the approach of specific pieces, or several pieces, there is no universal consensus on the parameters of graphic notation and its use.

History

Early history

Though its most popular usage occurred in the mid-twentieth century, the first evidence of graphic notation dates back much earlier. Originally called "eye music", these graphic scores bear much resemblance to the scores of composers like George Crumb. One of the earliest surviving pieces of eye music is Belle, Bonne, Sage by Baude Cordier, a Renaissance composer. His score, formed in the shape of a heart, was intended to enhance the meaning of the chanson. Characteristic of the Ars subtilior, "experimentations with mensural signs and graphic shapes and colours were often a feature of musical design – for the sake of visual, rather than necessarily audible effect." Another example of eye music from the ars subtilior is Jacob Senleches' La harpe de melodie, where the voices are notated on a stave that appears to be the strings of a harp. Eye music's popularity died down after the Humanist movement of the mid-16th century, later to be revitalized in the twentieth century as the use of graphic scores became prominent once again.

The 19th century music educator Pierre Galin developed a method of notating music known as the Galin-Paris-Chevé system, building on a notation system created in the 18th century by Jean-Jacques Rousseau. This system used numbers to indicate scale degrees, and used dots either above or below the note to indicate if they were in the lowest octave or the highest. The middle octave, relative to the example, contained no dots. Flats and sharps were notated using backslashes and forward slashes respectively. Prolongations of the note were notated using periods, and silence was notated with the number zero. This method was primarily used to teach sight-singing. The usage of symbols to indicate musical direction have been likened to an early version of graphic notation.

Uses in the twentieth century
Experimental music appeared in the United States and Europe during the 1950s, when many of the once untouchable parameters of traditional music began to be challenged. Aleatoric music, indeterminate music, musique concrète and electronic music shook previously unquestioned concepts, such as musical time or the function of the musician, and dared to add others to musical space in all its dimensions, with all their ontological consequences and burdens. They also changed the roles of the composer, the performer and the public, giving them totally new functions to explore.

In this context, the score, which had to a great extent been considered a mere support for musical writing (with the exception of eye music), began to flirt with the limits of the work and its identity. This marriage produced three paths: the first considered the musical score to be a representation of organized sound; the second conceived it as an extension of sound; and the third viewed it as another type of music, a visual music with its own autonomy, independent of sound. The score took on new meanings and went from being a mere support of sound to being an extension of the work, or even another work altogether, an element that was as important as the sounds and silences it contained, or more. These conceptions required a new language and a new reading of what it is to be musical. They also required a new notation, one that would reflect the changes taking place in the second artistic vanguards, and contain them, granting them a new semantics. In this way, taken with the porousness of experimental music with respect to the plastic arts, notation came to be more and more influenced by a dialogue with painting, installations and performativity. As J.Y. Bosseur mentions in La musique du XXè siècle à la croisé des artes, the score progressed towards representing the management of space, a graphic space that allows us to know the multiple connections enclosed within it.

Graphic notation in its modern form first appeared in the 1950s as an evolution of movement of Indeterminacy as pioneered by John Cage. The technique was originally used by avant-garde musicians and manifested itself as the use of symbols to convey information that could not be rendered with traditional notation such as extended techniques. Graphic scores have, since their conception, evolved into two broadly defined categories, one being the invention of new notation systems used to convey specific musical techniques and the other the use of conceptual notation such as shapes, drawings and other artistic techniques that are meant to evoke improvisation from the performer. Examples of the former include Morton Feldman's Projection 1, which was the result of Feldman drawing abstract shapes on graph paper, and Stockhausen's Prozession. Examples of the latter include Earle Brown's December 1952 and Cornelius Cardew's Treatise, which was written in response to Cage's 4'33" and which he wrote after having worked as Stockhausen's assistant. The score consists of 193 pages of lines and shapes on a white background. Here the lines represented elements in space and the score was merely a representation of that space at a given instant. In Europe, one of the most notable users was Sylvano Bussotti, whose scores have often been displayed as pieces of visual art by enthusiasts. In 1969, in an effort to promote the movement of abstract notation, John Cage and Allison Knowles published an archive of excerpts of scores by 269 composers with the intention of showing "the many directions in which notation is now going".

Other notable pioneers of graphic notation include composers such as Roman Haubenstock-Ramati, Mauricio Kagel, György Ligeti (Artikulation), Krzysztof Penderecki, Karlheinz Stockhausen, and Iannis Xenakis, Morton Feldman, Constance Cochnower Virtue, and Christian Wolff.

Twenty-first-century advancements
In 2008, Theresa Sauer edited a compendium featuring graphic scores by composers from over fifty countries, demonstrating how widespread the practice has become.

In addition to the more widespread popularity of graphic notation, new technology has expanded its possibilities. In his book The Digital Score: Musicianship, Creativity, and Innovation, Craig Vear describes how Artificial Intelligence and animation can be used to enhance the graphic score experience. He claims that these technologies are "the logical development of graphic score experiments from the latter part of the twentieth century. An interesting element of these is that they have to move in order for them to be read; without movement, they are unintelligible."

Examples

As a notational system

Time-based pictographic scores such as Waterwalk by John Cage, uses a combination of time marking a pictographic notation as instruction on how and when to perform certain actions.
Pictographic scores such as Stripsody by Cathy Berberian use only drawings and text, foregoing any sort of time reference. This allows the performer to interpret the piece as they like.
Line staves showing approximate pitch, with the actual pitches being decided upon performance.

Altered notation can be seen in George Crumb's work, where he uses traditional notation but presents the music on the page in a graphic or nontraditional manner such as spirals or circles. One example of altered notation is Crumb's Makrokosmos" for Amplified Piano. Crumb's score contained three detailed pages of instructions, with movements including Primeval Sounds, Crucifixus and Spiral Galaxy.
New specific notation system, that is, a new of specifically and graphically notate musical actions like that of Xenakis' Psappha.

As abstract visual reference
Time-based abstract representation, can be seen in Hans-Christoph Steiner's score for Solitude in which the music is represented using symbols and illustrations. Note that here, time is still represented horizontally from left to right like in a pitch graph system, and thus implies that the piece has a specific form.
Time-based abstract notation, such as Rudolf Komorous's Chanson utilizes abstract notation with time indication, or least a direction in which the piece is read and therefore implies a form.
Free abstract representations, such as Brown's December 1952, where the form, pitch material and instrumentation are left up to the performer.
Another example is John Cage's Aria, it might look like random squiggles, but each line indicates a different style of singing, notated in wavy lines in ten different colors, and the black squares indicate non specified 'non-musical' sounds.
Free abstract notation, such as Mark Applebaum's "The Metaphysics of Notation" and where elements of traditional music notation are melded with abstract designs. 
Another example is Tom Phillips' Golden Flower Piece, this piece uses uppercase letters to show notes that should be played in the bass, and lowercase letters played in a higher register. You're allowed to add flats and sharps as you please. And the dots around the notes are supposed to help with how loud to play the note, and how long to hold it for.

Other notable users
Notable practitioners of graphic notation not mentioned previously include:

Aphex Twin
Mark Applebaum
Carmen Barradas
Dennis Báthory-Kitsz
Cathy Berberian
Luciano Berio
John Bergamo
Anthony Braxton
André Boucourechliev
Leo Brouwer
Herbert Brün
Randolph Coleman
Henry Cowell
Emily Doolittle
Toby Driver
Iancu Dumitrescu
Brian Eno
Eric Ewazen
Morton Feldman
Goldie
Jerry Goldsmith
Michail Goleminov
Jonny Greenwood
Barry Guy
Lou Harrison
Alfred Harth
Panayiotis Kokoras
Andrzej Krzanowski
Bruno Liberda
Helmut Lachenmann
Yuri Landman
Anestis Logothetis
Raymond MacDonald
Robert Moran
Luigi Morleo
Conlon Nancarrow
Pauline Oliveros
Roberto Paci Dalò
Krzysztof Penderecki
Norbert Walter Peters
Deborah Pritchard
Sylvano Bussotti
Emanuel Dimas de Melo Pimenta
Randy Raine-Reusch
Rival Consoles
Bernard Rands
Roger Reynolds
Matana Roberts
Marina Rosenfeld
Sven-David Sandström
Leon Schidlowsky
R. Murray Schafer
Netty Simons
Stuart Saunders Smith
Wadada Leo Smith
Juan María Solare
Allen Strange
Shiori Usui
Michael Vetter
Claude Vivier
Jennifer Walshe
Sabrina Peña Young
John Zorn

See also
 Oramics

References

Further reading

 Lieberman, David 2006. "Game Enhanced Music Manuscript". In GRAPHITE '06: Proceedings of the 4th International Conference on Computer Graphics and Interactive Techniques in Australasia and South East Asia, ACM Press, Melbourne, Australia, 245–250.

External links
 Pictures of Music at Northwestern University
 Bergstroem-Nielsen, Carl: Experimental improvisation and notation practise 1945–1999; Experimental improvisation and notation practise, addenda 2000–. Online bibliographies.
 Real-time interpretation of Rainer Wehinger visualization of György Ligeti's electronic work Artikulation
 An online collection of graphic scores curated by the New York Miniaturist Ensemble
 Notations21, an anthology of innovative musical notation
 Raine-Reusch's page showing more than 20 graphic scores
 HighC: a graphic score-based composition system inspired by Iannis Xenakis' UPIC system.
 IanniX : A graphical real-time open-source sequencer for digital art
 Cuaderno de Yokohama by Llorenç Barber The complete series of 17 graphic scores that Barber created in Yokohama (Japan) in 2005. Ràdio Web MACBA: Barcelona, 2009.
 How to read and write Graphic Notation

Musical notation
Post-tonal music theory